John Jennings (1814–1876) was a Scottish-born Presbyterian clergyman from Canada notable for promoting the cause of education in Upper Canada.

References

Canadian Presbyterian ministers
1814 births
1876 deaths